Irregular, irregulars or irregularity may refer to any of the following:

Astronomy 
 Irregular galaxy
 Irregular moon
 Irregular variable, a kind of star

Language 
 Irregular inflection, the formation of derived forms such as plurals in unpredictable ways
 Irregular verb

Law
 Against regulations
 In canon law, an irregularity is an impediment for the Catholic priesthood or for exercising orders already received

Mathematics 

 Irregularity of a surface
 Irregularity of distributions
 Irregularity index

Medicine 

 Irregular bone
 Arrhythmia, also known as an irregular heartbeat
 Constipation, also called "irregularity"

Other 

 The Irregulars, a 2021 Netflix series
 Accounting irregularity
 Irregular military
 Irregular chess opening

See also 

 Anomaly (disambiguation)
 Baker Street Irregulars
 Regular (disambiguation)